The Sidon synagogue (Arabic: كنيس صيدا) is one of the oldest synagogues in the world. It is located in the old city of Sidon (Saida, Lebanon) in the Jewish neighborhood or quarter known colloquially as ḥarat al-yahūd (Arabic: حارة اليهود).

History
Built in 833, it is believed to rest on an older synagogue which dates back to the destruction of the Second Temple in 66 AD. Jesus is said to have preached in it and in its vicinity as attested in Matthew (15:21) and Mark (7:24).

Although not big in size, it is considered one of the main synagogues in Lebanon which includes the Maghen Abraham Synagogue in Beirut completed in 1925.

In April 2012, prayers were said for the first time after decades of desuetude by two rabbis from the Neturei Karta International movement who were participating in a march to mark Land Day.

Many Lebanese Jews began to leave Sidon after the Lebanese Civil War began in 1975, which explains the synagogue's dilapidated state.

See also
Deir el Qamar Synagogue (Mount Lebanon)
History of the Jews in Lebanon
Maghen Abraham Synagogue

References

Sephardi Jewish culture in Asia
Sephardi synagogues
Synagogues in Lebanon
Jewish Lebanese history
Sidon District
9th-century synagogues
Religious buildings and structures completed in 833